Finlandia is a symphonic poem by Jean Sibelius.

Finlandia may also refer to:

Music
 Finlandia Hymn, a section of the symphonic poem
 "Finlandia" (song), a 1981 song by Martha Ladly

Business
 Finlandia (vodka), a brand of vodka
 Finlandia Records, a division of the Warner Classics classical music record label
 Finlandia Cheese, a subsidiary of Valio, Ltd., a dairy manufacturer in Finland

Competitions
 Finlandia-Ajo, a horse racing event
 Finlandia-hiihto, a long-distance cross-country skiing competition
 Finlandia Trophy, a figure skating competition

Vehicles
 MS Finlandia (1966), a ferry operated by Finland Steamship Company 1967–1975 and Finnlines 1975–1978
 MS Finlandia (1980), a cruiseferry operated by Silja Line 1981–1990
 MS Finlandia (2000), a cruiseferry operated by Eckerö Line since 2012
 TS TS Vanadis or Finlandia, a luxury turbine yacht
 Finlandia (car), a historic car brand
 Saab 900 CD or Finlandia

Other uses
 Finland or Finlandia
 Finlandia (film), a 1922 propaganda and documentary film
 Sirkus Finlandia, a circus in Finland
 Finlandia Hall, a concert hall in Helsinki, Finland
 Finlandia Prize,  a Finnish literature award
 Finlandia University, a private university in Hancock, Michigan
 the Finnish Labour Temple, also known as the Finlandia Club, a cultural and community centre in Thunder Bay, Ontario, Canada
 Finlandia (candy), fruit marmalade candy produced by Fazer

See also
Finland (disambiguation)
 MS Finlandia, a list of ships